Cape Romano is a cape on the Gulf Coast of Florida, United States, below Naples, just beyond the southwestern tip of Marco Island and northwest of the Ten Thousand Islands in Collier County.

Calusa Indians founded the settlement and called it Manataca. Juan Ponce de León briefly stopped at Manataca on his first trip from Puerto Rico to Florida, but the Indians tried to fight him off.

There are two competing theories about why the island is called Cape Romano. One theory that Cape Romano got its name from the survivors of a Romanian shipwreck that colonized the island in 1834.   Another undocumented theory is Cape Romano was named after it by British surveyor Bernard Roman who sailed by it in 1775.

Cape Romano is also the location of the country's first Romanian Orthodox Church. Completed in 1837, the ruins can still be found on the island just off the beach. It was destroyed in 1897 by a fire after multiple hurricanes forced the inhabitants from the Island.

Cape Romano is where Hurricane Irma made its second U.S. landfall in September 2017 and Hurricane Wilma made its first U.S. landfall in October 2005.  Hurricane Wilma made landfall near Cape Romano in Collier County, Florida, bringing its approximately 10-foot storm surge into the Ten Thousand Islands region of Collier County.   In 2008, Tropical Storm Fay came ashore near the cape, as had the 1910 Cuba hurricane.

Hammerhead sharks are a known breeding ground along the sandy flats of Cape Romano.

See also 
 Cape Romano Dome House
 Cape Romano Stilt Houses

References

Romano
Landforms of Collier County, Florida